Juliet Law Packer (born c. 1952) is an American television writer. She graduated from Princeton University -  1974 and received a master's degree in film and television from Northwestern University - 1977. She attended New Trier High School  - 1970.

Positions held

All My Children
Breakdown Writer: December 1997 - August 2001, October 21, 2004 - June 30, 2005

General Hospital
Breakdown Writer: 2001 - 2002

Another World
Breakdown Writer: 1997

As the World Turns
Co-Head Writer: March 7, 1993 - January 1995
Breakdown Writer: 1988 - March 1993

The City
Breakdown Writer: 1995 - 1997

Days of Our Lives
Breakdown Writer: 2003

Search for Tomorrow
Writer: 1982 - 1985

Falcon Crest - multiple episodes

The Waltons - multiple episodes 1977-1981

Palmerstown, USA - multiple episodes, story consultant

Awards and nominations
Daytime Emmy Awards

NOMINATIONS 
(1991, 1993 & 1996; Best Writing; As the World Turns)
(1999, 2001 & 2002; Best Writing; All My Children)

Writers Guild of America Award

WINS
(1985 season; Search for Tomorrow)
(1999, 2001 & 2002 seasons; All My Children)

NOMINATIONS 
(1990 season; As the World Turns)
(2000 season; All My Children)

External links
 

Loving & The City Cast/Crew

Living people
American soap opera writers
Place of birth missing (living people)
American women television writers
1950s births
Princeton University alumni
Northwestern University School of Communication alumni
Women soap opera writers
Writers Guild of America Award winners
21st-century American women